Entomophaga is a genus of entomopathogenic fungi in the Entomophthoraceae family and also the order Entomophthorales. This has been supported by molecular phylogenetic analysis (Gryganskyi et al. 2012).

Well-known species are Entomophaga grylli and Entomophaga maimaiga, which can infect grasshoppers and gypsy moths respectively.

The genus name of Entomophaga was derived from combining two words in the Greek, entomon means insect and phaga means to eat. The genus was created in 1964 by the Polish mycologist Andrzej Batko (1933 - 1997). He wrote “... to commemorate the international journal Entomophaga devoted to problems of biological control of insect pests.” The journal later ceased publication in 1998 and was replaced by BioControl.

Species
As accepted by Species Fungorum;

 Entomophaga antochae S. Keller, 2007
 Entomophaga apiculata (Thaxt.) S. Keller, 1991
 Entomophaga aulicae (E. Reichardt) Humber, 1984
 Entomophaga batkoi (Balazy) S. Keller, 1988
 Entomophaga bukidnonensis Villac. & Wilding, 1994
 Entomophaga calopteni (Bessey) Humber, 1989
 Entomophaga caroliniana (Thaxt.) Samson, H.C. Evans & Latgé, 1988
 Entomophaga conglomerata (Sorokin) S. Keller, 1988
 Entomophaga destruens (Weiser & A. Batko) A. Batko, 1964
 Entomophaga diprionis Balazy, 1993
 Entomophaga domestica S. Keller, 1988
 Entomophaga gigantea (S. Keller) S. Keller, 1988
 Entomophaga grylli (Fresen.) A. Batko, 1964
 Entomophaga kansana (J.A. Hutchison) A. Batko, 1964
 Entomophaga lagriae Balazy, 1993
 Entomophaga limoniae S. Keller, 1988
 Entomophaga maimaiga Humber, Shimazu & R.S. Soper, 1988
 Entomophaga major (Thaxt.) S. Keller, 1991
 Entomophaga obscura (I.M. Hall & P.H. Dunn) A. Batko, 1964
 Entomophaga papillata (Thaxt.) S. Keller, 1988
 Entomophaga ptychopterae (S. Keller & Eilenberg) A.E. Hajek & Eilenberg, 2003
 Entomophaga pyriformis Balazy, 1993
 Entomophaga saccharina (Giard) A. Batko, 1964
 Entomophaga tabanivora (J.F. Anderson & Magnar.) Humber, 1984
 Entomophaga tenthredinis (Fresen.]]) A. Batko, 1964
 Entomophaga thaxteriana A. Batko, 1964
 Entomophaga thuricensis S. Keller, 2007
 Entomophaga tipulae (Fresen.) Humber, 1989
 Entomophaga transitans (S. Keller) A.E. Hajek & Eilenberg, 2003

References

Entomophthorales
Parasitic fungi